Sparkle Taylor (born July 28, 1995) is an American professional basketball player whois a free agent in the Women's National Basketball Association (WNBA). She played college basketball at UTEP. Taylor went undrafted during the 2017 WNBA Draft. She appeared in the league in 2022 with the Chicago Sky.

College career
During Taylor's freshman season at UTEP, she was known as someone who wasn't afraid of contact and went to the free throw line often. She got to the line 77 times during that season. In her sophomore season, Taylor was inserted into the starting line up and was second on the team in scoring at 10.3 points. She was moved back to the bench during her junior season and averaged 9.8 points, but was award the C-USA Sixth Woman of the Year award in 2016. Her senior year, Taylor's offense exploded when she went over 18.4 points, 6.4 rebounds, and 1.7 assists. On a team full of freshman, Taylor was called upon to do a lot for the Miners. Taylor scored 34 point in back to back games against North Texas and Rice to become the first player in program history to score 30+ points in back-to-backs. She won the Player of the Week on February 20, 2017, for those efforts.

College statistics

Professional career

Overseas
Following her UTEP career, Taylor signed with Forex Time Apollon Limassol basketball club of Cyprus' Divions A league in 2017.

In the 2021–2022 season, Taylor played for Satu Mare in the Romania-Liga Nationala. In January 2022, Taylor was averaging 23.3 points, 7.7 rebounds, 2.6 assists, and 1.6 steals.

WNBA

Chicago Sky
Taylor signed a training camp contract with the Chicago Sky in 2021, but did not make the team and was waived from training camp on May 10, 2021.

Taylor returned the Sky's training camp in 2022 and was once again waived on May 4, 2022. Taylor was brought back right before the season opener on a Hardship Contract player due to Chicago's roster having multiple players missing. Taylor made her WNBA debut on May 6, 2022, against the Los Angeles Sparks. On May 13, 2022, Taylor was released from her hardship contract after appearing in 2 games with the Sky

WNBA career statistics

Regular season

|-
| align="left" | 2022
| align="left" | Chicago
| 2 || 0 || 12.5 || .833 || .000 || 1.000 || 1.0 || 0.0 || 0.0 || 0.0 || 0.5 || 5.5
|-
| align="left" | Career
| align="left" | 1 year, 1 team
| 2 || 0 || 12.5 || .833 || .000 || 1.000 || 1.0 || 0.0 || 0.0 || 0.0 || 0.5 || 5.5

References

External links
WNBA bio
UTEP bio

1995 births
Living people
American women's basketball players
Basketball players from Michigan
Guards (basketball)
UTEP Miners women's basketball players
Chicago Sky players
People from Flint, Michigan